Sid or SID may refer to:

Organizations
 Danish General Workers' Union, former trade union in Denmark
 Security and Intelligence Division, Singapore's Foreign intelligence agency
 Servizio Informazioni Difesa, the Italian military secret service 1965-1977
 Service for Research and Documentation, the Serbian intelligence agency
 Society for Information Display
 Society for International Development
 Sport-Informations-Dienst, German sports media service
 Special Investigations Division (disambiguation)

Places
 Šid, Vojvodina, Serbia
 Šíd, village in Slovakia
 River Sid, in Devon, England

Science and technology
 Sid blood group system
 Saab Information Display in cars
 Security Identifier, used by Microsoft
 Slew-induced distortion, in an amplifier
 Source to image-receptor distance, in radiology
 Sudden ionospheric disturbance, caused by a solar flare
 Surface-induced dissociation, in mass spectrometry
 System identification number, in wireless telephony
 Sound Interface Device in MOS Technology 6581 CBM CPU 
 mSin3 interaction domain, a transcriptional repressor domain
 .sid, MrSID image file extension
 The unstable distribution of Debian

Entertainment
 Síd, a fairy mound in Irish  folklore
 Sid (band), a Japanese rock band
 Superman Is Dead, or S.I.D., an Indonesian rock band
 Space Intruder Detector, satellite in the UK TV series UFO
 Sid Vere, a fictional character from Doctors
 The given name of the Cookie Monster is Sid.

Transport
 Standard instrument departure, aircraft procedure
 Amílcar Cabral International Airport, Sal Island, Cape Verde
 Sidcup railway station (National Rail station code), London, England

Other uses
 Sid (given name)
 Status–income disequilibrium, a political term
 Sports information director

See also 
 CID (disambiguation)
 SIDS (disambiguation)
 Syd (disambiguation)